Benjamin Bloomfield Gough (1814-1893) was a nineteenth century Anglican priest.

Gough was born in County Tipperary and educated at Corpus Christi College, Cambridge,  graduating BA in 1835 and Master of Arts in 1842. He was the curate at Culdaff; Rector of Dunboe; of then the Archdeacon of Derry from 1846 until his resignation in 1849. He then held incumbencies at Urney and Maghera.

References

1893 deaths
1814 births
Archdeacons of Derry
Alumni of Trinity College Dublin
People from County Tipperary